is a former Japanese football player.

Playing career
Schneider was born in Shinjuku, Tokyo on May 22, 1977. He is the son of a Swiss-German father and a Japanese mother. After graduating from Meisei University, he joined Prefectural Leagues club Gunma FC Fortona in 2000. In 2001, he moved to J2 League club Sagan Tosu. He debuted in 2002 and played many matches as goalkeeper. He became a regular goalkeeper from summer 2004. In 2007, he moved to J2 club Vegalta Sendai. He became a regular goalkeeper soon. However he lost his position for injury in June 2007 and he could not play at all in the match after the injury. In 2009, he moved to Japan Football League (JFL) club Gainare Tottori. He played all 34 matches in 2009 season. In 2010, he moved to J2 club Yokohama FC. Although he played many matches until summer 2010, he could not play at all in the match behind Kentaro Seki from September 2010. In April 2012, Schneider became a regular goalkeeper again under new manager Motohiro Yamaguchi. In 2014, he moved to Regional Leagues club Nara Club. The club was promoted to JFL from 2015. He retired end of 2015 season.

Club statistics

References

External links

1977 births
Living people
Meisei University alumni
Association football people from Tokyo
Japanese footballers
J2 League players
Japan Football League players
Arte Takasaki players
Sagan Tosu players
Vegalta Sendai players
Gainare Tottori players
Yokohama FC players
Nara Club players
Association football goalkeepers
Japanese people of German descent
Japanese people of Swiss descent
People of Swiss-German descent